Red Mountain is a set of three peaks in the San Juan Mountains of western Colorado in the United States, about  south of Ouray.  The mountains get their name from the reddish iron ore rocks that cover the surface.  Several other peaks in the San Juan Mountains likewise have prominent reddish coloration from iron ore and are also called "Red Mountain".

Nearby Red Mountain Pass is named after Red Mountain, and the ghost town mining camp of Red Mountain Town is located around Red Mountain.

Red Mountain Town

Following sporadic settling of the region in the 1870s, a series of permanent mining towns were founded in what became known as the Red Mountain Mining District. Among these was Red Mountain Town, which was founded following discoveries of silver in 1882. Other communities in the area included Ironton and Guston, which were eventually connected with the larger towns of Silverton and Ouray via the Silverton Railroad and later the Million Dollar Highway.

Gallery

See also

List of Colorado mountain ranges
List of Colorado mountain summits
List of Colorado fourteeners
List of Colorado 4000 meter prominent summits
List of the most prominent summits of Colorado
List of Colorado county high points

References

Mountains of Ouray County, Colorado
San Juan Mountains (Colorado)
North American 3000 m summits
Mountains of Colorado